Alvin W. Patton (born September 18, 1937) is an American politician in the state of Minnesota. He served in the Minnesota House of Representatives.

References

1937 births
Living people
People from Sartell, Minnesota
People from Sauk Rapids, Minnesota
Military personnel from Minnesota
Democratic Party members of the Minnesota House of Representatives